Derek McGrath (born 3 May 1960) is a former Irish rugby union international player who played for the Irish national rugby union team. Educated at St Michael's College, Dublin, he played as a flanker.

He played for the Ireland team from 1984 to 1987, winning 5 caps and was a member of the Ireland squad at 1987 Rugby World Cup. He made his debut in May 1984 against Scotland in a 9-32 defeat. McGrath is a qualified veterinary surgeon.

He was appointed as Chief Executive of European Rugby Cup (ERC) in 2000, a position he left in October 2014 rather than joining the new European Professional Club Rugby, the organisation which replaces the ERC.

References

External links
ESPN Profile

1960 births
Living people
Irish rugby union players
Ireland international rugby union players
People educated at St Michael's College, Dublin
Rugby union flankers